Derek Parkin (born 2 January 1948) is an English former football player who made a record number of appearances for Wolverhampton Wanderers (609). He also played for Huddersfield Town and Stoke City as well as the England under-23 national side

Career
Parkin made his Football League debut on 7 November 1964 for Huddersfield Town against Bury, aged 16. In February 1968, he became at the time the most expensive full-back in Britain when he joined First Division side Wolves for £80,000. He made his club debut on 24 February 1968 against his hometown side Newcastle United.

Over 14 years at Molineux, he made a record number of senior appearances – 609, including 501 league games, also a club record. He played 50 or more competitive matches in a season for Wolves no fewer than five times – another record – and in seasons 1968–69 and 1969–70, he took part in every single league and cup match played by the club. His long service saw him receive a testimonial match in 1979 and become one of the initial inductees into the club's Hall of Fame. He appeared in two Wembley Cup Finals, collecting a winner's medal each time as Wolves won the League Cup in both 1974 and 1980, and also earned a Second Division championship medal in 1976–77.

Parkin ended his 15-season spell at Wolves by joining Stoke City on a free transfer in March 1982. He played ten matches for Stoke in 1981–82 and the played in 35 matches in 1982–83 before retiring from playing football. After his footballing career ended in May 1983, he moved into landscape gardening. He has also been involved in charity work in Wolverhampton.

International career
The full-back made five appearances for the England U23 side between 1969 and 1971. He was called up to the full team in 1971 for a European Championship qualifier in Malta, but did not appear in the match.

Career statistics
Source:

A.  The "Other" column constitutes appearances and goals in the Anglo-Italian Cup, Texaco Cup, UEFA Cup and Watney Cup.

Honours
 Wolverhampton Wanderers
 Football League Second Division champions: 1976–77
 Football League Cup winner: 1974, 1980
 Texaco Cup winner: 1970–71

References

1948 births
Living people
English footballers
England under-23 international footballers
Footballers from Newcastle upon Tyne
English Football League players
Association football defenders
Wolverhampton Wanderers F.C. players
Huddersfield Town A.F.C. players
Stoke City F.C. players
English Football League representative players